Erick Lonnis Bolaños (born 9 September 1965 in San José) is a retired Costa Rican football goalkeeper who played during the 1990s and early 2000s.

Club career
Lonnis made his debut in the Costa Rica Premier Division for Cartaginés on 22 July 1990 against Herediano and also played for Carmelita. He however played the majority of his career for Deportivo Saprissa, where he reached local stardom, becoming one of the most emblematic figures for the fans, either as Saprissa's or Costa Rica's national squad goalkeeper. He was the captain for Saprissa during several seasons, where he won four national championships, as well as two CONCACAF Champions Cup in 1993 and 1995. He totalled 362 games for the club.

International career
He made his debut for Costa Rica in a December 1992 FIFA World Cup qualification match against St Vincent & the Grenadines and earned a total of 76 caps, scoring no goals. He holds the record for the goalkeeper with the most appearances for the senior Costa Rica national football team. He represented his country in 9 FIFA World Cup qualifiers and was the captain of Costa Rica's team that played the 2002 FIFA World Cup held in Korea and Japan, where he reaffirmed the leadership and excellent reflexes that characterized him through all his career. He also played at the 1993, 1995, 1997, 1999 and 2001 UNCAF Nations Cups as well as at the 1993, 1998 and 2002 CONCACAF Gold Cups and the 1997 and 2001 Copa América tournaments.

His final international was the final 2002 World Cup match against Brazil.

Retirement
After retiring in April 2003 due to injury, Lonnis became the assistant of Costa Rica's national squad, due to his vast experience as a player and his leadership. On May 7 officially turned down Carmelita's offer to be their head coach.

Personal life
Lonnis married former beauty queen Tatiana Bolaños in 2002 but they later separated. However, their first child, daughter Isabella, was  born in July 2013.

References

External links
 

1965 births
Living people
Footballers from San José, Costa Rica
Association football goalkeepers
Costa Rican footballers
Costa Rica international footballers
1993 CONCACAF Gold Cup players
1993 UNCAF Nations Cup players
1995 UNCAF Nations Cup players
1997 UNCAF Nations Cup players
1997 Copa América players
1998 CONCACAF Gold Cup players
2001 UNCAF Nations Cup players
2001 Copa América players
2002 CONCACAF Gold Cup players
2002 FIFA World Cup players
C.S. Cartaginés players
A.D. Carmelita footballers
Deportivo Saprissa players
Deportivo Saprissa non-playing staff
Copa Centroamericana-winning players